Nehru Park is located on the banks of the Damodar River at Burnpur, a neighbourhood in Asansol in the Indian state of West Bengal.

Name
The park was planned by F. W. A. Lahmeyer, general manager of the IISCO Steel Plant. Although officially named Riverside Park, it was nicknamed Lahmeyer Park. In 1989, the 100-year anniversary of the birth of India’s first Prime Minister, Jawaharlal Nehru, the park was renamed Nehru Park. A cast iron statue of Nehru, cast at Kulti Works, then part of IISCO, was installed in the park.

References

Images

Protected areas of West Bengal
Gardens in India
Asansol
Parks in India
Monuments and memorials to Jawaharlal Nehru
Tourist attractions in Paschim Bardhaman district
Protected areas with year of establishment missing